Kuakata (Burmese/Rakhine/Arakanese:ကုအာကာတ) is a town in southern Bangladesh known for its panoramic sea beach. From the beach one can have an unobstructed view of both sunrise and sunset over the Bay of Bengal.

Etymology 
The name Kuakata originated from the word 'kua' — the Bengali word for "well" which was dug on the seashore by the early Rakhine settlers(Burmese tribes) in quest of collecting drinking water. They landed on the Kuakata coast in the 18th century after being expelled from Arakan (Myanmar) by the Burmese extremists . Afterwards, it has become a tradition of digging wells in the neighbourhoods of Rakhaine tribes for water.

Geography
Kuakata is situated in Kalapara Upazila, Patuakhali District.

Demographics
According to the 2011 Bangladesh census, Kuakata had 2,065 households and a population of 9,077.

Culture

Kuakata is a place of pilgrimage for Hindu and Buddhist communities. Innumerable devotees arrive here at the festivals of 'Rush Purnima' and 'Maghi Purnima'. On these  occasions the pilgrims take holy baths at the bay and participate in the traditional fairs. One may visit a 100-year-old Buddhist temple where the statue of Goutama Buddha and two 200-year-old wells are located.

Tourism
The town Kuakata has sea beach named Kuakata Beach. Many tourists visit the place to see the beach although it hasn’t international recognition like Cox's Bazar Beach but it is popular in Bangladesh. There are many places tourist visit such as -
 Kuakata National Park
 Kuakata Ecopark
 Forest of Fatra : The protected mangrove forest on the western side of the beach is known as the 'second Sundarban'
 Well of Kuakata: At the beginning of Rakhine village Keranipara near Kuakata Beach is an ancient well near a Buddhist monastery.
 Shima Buddhist Monastery: In front of the ancient well is the ancient Seema Buddhist Vihara, which contains a meditating Buddha image made of Ashta dhatu weighing about thirty-seven maunds.
 Rakhaine settlement of Keranipara: Keranipara, the village of the Rakhine tribesmen, begins in front of Seema Buddhist Vihar;
 Alipur Port : About four kilometers north of Kuakata is Alipur Mohipur, one of the largest fishing centers in the southern region;
 Mishripara Buddhist Monastery: About eight kilometers east of Kuakata beach, Misripara, home to Rakhine tribes, has a Buddhist monastery that houses the largest Buddhist statue in the subcontinent.
 Forest of Gangamati: Gangamati or Ghazmati forest along the Gangamati canal east of Kuakata beach.

Gallery

See also
 List of cities and towns in Bangladesh
 Cox's Bazar – a tourist beach town in southeastern Bangladesh
 Patenga – a tourist beach in the city of Chittagong

References

External links 

 
 Kuakata Travel Guide 

Tourism in Bangladesh
Populated places in Patuakhali District